Majerhat railway station is a Kolkata Suburban Railway Station on the Budge Budge Branch line with an approximate  distance from the Sealdah railway station. It is under the jurisdiction of the Eastern Railway zone of Indian Railways. Majerhat railway station is one of the busiest railway stations in the Sealdah railway division. More than 45 pairs of EMU local trains pass through the railway station on a daily basis. It is situated in Kolkata in the Indian state of West Bengal. Majerhat railway station serves Majerhat and the surrounding areas.

Geography

History

Electrification

Station complex
The platform is very much well sheltered. The station possesses many facilities including water and sanitation. There is a proper approach road to this station.

References

Railway junction stations in West Bengal
Railway stations in Kolkata
Sealdah railway division
Kolkata Suburban Railway stations
Kolkata Circular Railway
Railway stations in India opened in 1890
1890 establishments in the British Empire